Fable: The Journey is an action role-playing on rails video game, the fifth  in the Fable series. It was developed by Lionhead Studios and published by Microsoft Studios for Xbox 360, as a Kinect title. First announced at the 2011 Electronic Entertainment Expo, the game is a standalone title, separate from the main series. Unlike previous games, Fable: The Journey was developed using Unreal Engine 3.

Gameplay
Fable: The Journey is an action role-playing video game that has players use Kinect to manipulate magic in order to defeat enemies. By using their hands to perform certain gestures, players can cast a variety of spells, ranging from electric bolts to magic shards. As enemies are defeated, experience is collected which the player can use to upgrade health and spells.

A large portion of the game takes place with the player character's horse. Driving the horse requires "holding" the reins and guiding the horse along a path. The player must also care for their horse by petting and brushing it as well as caring for it when it gets hurt.

There is also cross-game interaction with Fable Heroes. Playing Fable Heroes will level up the character in Fable: The Journey as well as unlock additional items.

Plot

Gabriel takes the place as the Hero of the latest story for the Fable series, starting out as an ordinary Dweller. His journey begins when he is separated from his fellow Dwellers while staying near Bowerstone. As he attempts to reunite with his people, he encounters Theresa who is wounded and fleeing from the Corruption. At first Gabriel acts cowardly, beginning to run at the first sight of trouble. However he soon returns, helping the blind seer onto the cart and urging Seren to avoid the devastating forces of the Corruption's first lieutenant, The Devourer. Narrowly escaping the attack, Gabriel's relief turns to horror when Theresa admits that the Devourer's attack poisoned his horse. She offers a way to heal Seren, but warns that it will take personal sacrifice on Gabriel's part. Gabriel readily agrees.
Travelling to the Spirit Chambers, a temple of the Enlightened, Gabriel was told to dip his hands into the Pool of Sight to recover the power that would enable him to heal Seren. After receiving a disturbing vision of Albion's downfall at the hands of the Corruption and passing a series of tests in a spiritual realm, Gabriel returns with a pair of gauntlets, much like those used by the old Hero King. Using their power, he heals his animal companion, only to realize that they are stuck on his arms and cannot be removed. Revealing this to be the sacrifice she warned of, Theresa offers a way out of this predicament for Gabriel. This solution, however, was located in the far-off Forge of Fire, another Enlightened temple that was located on the edge of the massive forest of Thorndeep. Begrudgingly, Gabriel took Theresa back on the cart and set off for the temple.

Passing through the thick forest, the duo came across a series of hobbe forts blocking the roads. Setting off on foot, Gabriel travelled through the old gold mines before coming across a local woodsman named Fergus, who had been tied up and captured by the hobbes. Releasing him, Fergus and Gabriel reunited with Theresa and Seren, and the group made their way further into the forest. Deciding to stay at Fergus' place for the night, Gabriel and Fergus were interrupted by the sudden appearance of native balverines. Fighting their way to Seren and Theresa, the two warriors managed to fight off the creatures. The next morning, upon leaving Fergus' home, the Devourer came upon the group once more, forcing Fergus to join Gabriel and Theresa on their journey. Once again running for their lives, the trio managed to escape into the light, back on course to the temple. Facing a myriad of foes on the way, the group nevertheless managed to safely arrive at the Forge of Fire, where Fergus found the remains of his wife, Peg. With Fergus busy burying the remains, Gabriel managed to pass the trials and tribulations of the temple, claiming the Willstone of the Hero Blaze in the process. Unfortunately, it was at this moment that the Devourer personally attacked the group, determined to stop them once and for all. Fighting off his minions, Gabriel was still no match for the Corruption's lieutenant, who disabled his opponent and proceeded to taunt him, warning the Dweller that there was no hope left for Albion. Desperate, Gabriel called upon Fergus to aid him in his hour of need, a request that drove the once-cowardly woodsman to put aside his fear and save his friend. Distracting the Devourer, Fergus' death gave Gabriel the opportunity to destroy the abomination for good. Mourning the death of Fergus, Gabriel admitted to Theresa that he would not take off the gauntlets, resolute in helping Albion in its time of need and moving on to the next temple.

Travelling through the dangerous hills of Miremoor, Theresa and Gabriel were stopped by the wreckage of a long caravan of carts, left burning in the open road. Looking for survivors, the duo only found one, a farm girl by the name of Betty. Claiming to be one of the few survivors, the sympathetic Gabriel let Betty join Theresa and himself in their attempt to cross the River Ironwash, as Betty believed that her father may have escaped there. Betty guided Gabriel through a shortcut to the River Ironwash, past the haunted lands of the Fallen Fen. Fighting alongside the ghosts of the Albion Royal Army, Gabriel used his power to drive off the hollow men and light the great beacon, which banished all remaining hollow men, freed the soldiers from their curse, and made the Fallen Fen safe again.

Proceeding to Sable's Crossing, Gabriel blasted a way through the bridge, much to the disgust of the Toll keeper, and made his way to the Whitespire Mountains. Fighting through Northward Fort, the group made a much-needed stop at the abandoned watchtower known as the Far Watch, where Betty and Gabriel made their feelings clear for each other. Interrupted by Theresa, Gabriel kept watch at the campsite while Betty allegedly went out to get more firewood before she was captured by the second of the Corruption's lieutenants – the foul Temptress. Urging Seren to catch up, the Temptress lead the Dweller and the Seer to The Shattered Prism, the last of the temples and home to the Willstone of Sol, the Hero of Light. Passing its trials, Gabriel emerged victorious, Willstone in hand and ready to get Theresa to the Spire to fight off the Corruption once and for all. It was here, however, where the recently recovered Betty revealed her true nature as the Temptress herself, blasting Theresa aside and attempting to kill the Dweller in an intense battle of the wills. Pulling himself together, Gabriel managed to cast aside the Temptress' tricks and defeated her in single combat, destroying her at long last. Helping Theresa back on the cart, the group continued their journey.

Continuing westward, Theresa and Gabriel once again had to fight off the Corruption's growing forces, battling their way through the Echo Hills of Albion. It was here where Gabriel at long last caught up to his old friend, Katlan, who had been mortally wounded in a vicious balverine attack. Fighting off the creatures, Gabriel could only console his dying friend, who readily admitted that Heroes did indeed still exist upon seeing Gabriel's ability before passing away. Resolute in his campaign against the Corruption, Theresa and Gabriel went through the nearby tunnels and emerged in the canyon-ridden landscape of Deepgorge. With the Corruption having completely overridden this once-rich area, the duo had to fight their way through the industrial town of Bastion before arriving at their final destination, the beach of Kraken's Jaw. Preparing to take the deactivated Cullis Gate, it was here where Theresa revealed that she only had the power to teleport two people to the Spire, abandoning Seren to the approaching hordes of the Corruption. Though apprehensive about leaving his lifelong companion and friend, Gabriel finally gathered the strength to let Seren go, taking Theresa's hand and teleporting to the ancient Old Kingdom tower.

There, in the Spire, Gabriel had to undergo one last trial – the sacrifice of Theresa herself. Channelling the light through the Seer, this power was enough to drive the Corruption back, buying Theresa the time to make her final wish. Escaping to the heart of the Spire, Gabriel managed to escape the doomed tower mere seconds before it was destroyed, apparently killing both Theresa and the leader of the Corruption, the Corruptor himself.

Walking the beaches of Kraken's Jaw, Gabriel reflected on his journey and his new destiny to protect Albion from any future threats before finding Theresa's blindfold, left lying in the sand. It is at the end of the game that Gabriel is revealed to be newly blinded, just as Theresa had been, before adorning the Seer's blindfold.

Reception

Fable: The Journey has received a range of mixed reviews. It received an aggregated score of 61/100 on Metacritic.

Giant Bomb praised the game’s characters, humor and emotional depth: "You end up genuinely feeling sorry for certain characters on several occasions when bad things happen to them, and the game culminates in a moment that will likely be among the most poignant seen in a game this year".

The strongest criticisms of the game came from Destructoid, who said: "...altogether it's evident that Lionhead worked hard on this latest Fable adventure. That does not mean, however, that it's good. Far from it. As much as Lionhead may have tried its level best, the limitations of Kinect ensure, at every step, that The Journey is boring when it works and tear-inducing when it doesn't".

References

External links

Role-playing video games
Action role-playing video games
Fable (video game series)
Kinect games
Lionhead Studios games
Microsoft games
Single-player video games
Unreal Engine games
Video game spin-offs
Video games developed in the United Kingdom
Video games scored by Russell Shaw
Xbox 360 games
Xbox 360-only games
2012 video games